Shree Ghatage (born 1957) is a Canadian writer. She was born in Bombay, India and moved to Canada in 1983, settling in St. John's, Newfoundland and Labrador. She has won three awards in the Newfoundland and Labrador Arts and Letters Competition.

Her written works share a common theme, describing life in India based on her own memories and experiences. Ghatage's first book, Awake When All the World is Asleep (1997), a collection of short stories set in Bombay, was awarded the Thomas Head Raddall Award.

She currently lives in Calgary, Alberta.

Bibliography
Awake When All the World Is Asleep (1997)
Brahma's Dream (2005)
Thirst (2012)

Awards
Thomas Raddall Atlantic Fiction Prize
Shortlisted, Danuta Gleed Award, 1998
Shortlisted, Newfoundland and Labrador Book Award, 1998

References

External links
Penguin Random House of Canada

1957 births
Living people
Canadian women novelists
Canadian writers of Asian descent
Canadian people of Indian descent
Indian emigrants to Canada
Writers from Calgary
Writers from Mumbai
20th-century Canadian novelists
21st-century Canadian novelists
20th-century Canadian women writers
21st-century Canadian women writers